"" is a song by Mexican singer Paulina Rubio. The song was recorded for her tenth studio album, Brava!, due out on November 15, 2011. The song made its debut online as the lead single on September 2, 2011 and was made available for purchase on Amazon.com and iTunes starting on September 6, 2011, about a week before it was released as a digital single worldwide and sent to radio station globally. The track was nominated for Pop Song of the Year at the Premio Lo Nuestro 2013.

Background
"Me Gustas Tanto" was written by Rubio herself along with Nacho, from the Venezuelan due Chino & Nacho and Andrés Recio, and it was produced by RedOne, the man responsible for huge hits of Lady Gaga, Enrique Iglesias, Jennifer Lopez, Mohombi, Usher, Kelly Rowland, Pitbull and others. The single has been described as a fresh song with simple lyrics and a catchy beat. It is a dance-pop song with a Latin rhythm touch and it clearly uses an electronic sound with a pulsating repeat of “OE OE EO!” chorus. Italian platform Notizie Musica describes it as an "unbearably captivating" song that "finds its way between Latin rhythms and purely Latin vocal influences".

Release
Paulina confirmed the release of the single via Twitter saying  “I want to be the first one to let you know my NEW single hits radio Sept 13th.” While she didn't indicate the genre of the new song, her statement suggested the song might be a dance track. “Are you ready to dance?” Rubio, additionally, did not indicate if the single will be released in both English and Spanish. But her statement to news announcing the track was given in both languages. According to LALATE, a celebrity news site narrowing on Rubio's career, the single, "Me Gustas Tanto" made its debut September 2, 2011 on the same site. The single is available for purchase on Amazon.com and ITunes starting on September 6, 2011, about a week before it was released as a digital single worldwide and sent to radio station globally.

Music video
The music video was directed by Gustavo Lopez Mañas and herself, and was filmed on at Little River Studios in Miami, Florida; in late September 2011, described the first day of shooting the video as "a looong productive, fashionable, exciting, happy, explosive and well worth day!" Rubio got involved in the editing and montage of the music video. It premiered on October 27 on her VEVO channel, on YouTube.

The CromosomaX gay website was very rigorous with the reception of the video and compared some of Rubio's looks with the latest works of the English singer Alison Goldfrapp.

Chart performance
The song debuted at #15 on the Spanish Promusicae Top 50 Songs as the major entry to the list. The song peaked at #4 on the Spanish Promusicae Top 50 Songs. It eventually peaked #1 on the Spanish Airplay Chart. In the US the song has picked up some steam with local radio stations playing the song more, and now it has become Rubio's fifth number-one song on the Billboard Hot Latin Songs component chart and her last #1 to date. The song also moved up from #6 to #2 on the Latin Pop Songs. In Mexico the song peaked at #4. The song also made a huge jump to #1 in Puerto Rico.

Track listing and formats 

CD and Digital Single
 "Me Gustas Tanto" – 3:42

Mexican Remixes—Enhanced
 "Me Gustas Tanto" (Vein Electro) – 2:56
 "Me Gustas Tanto" (Urban Remix) – 4:32
 "Me Gustas Tanto" (3Ball) – 3:49
 "Me Gustas Tanto" Behind the Scenes (Video) – 3:52

Argentinian Remixes
 "Me Gustas Tanto" (Disco Remix) Feat. Ez Vargas – 5:27
 "Me Gustas Tanto" (Urban Dance Remix) Feat. Franco "El Gorila" – 4:49
 "Me Gustas Tanto" (Electro Hopp Remix) Feat. Gocho – 2:56
 "Me Gustas Tanto" – 3:42

Charts

Weekly charts

Year-end charts

See also
List of Billboard number-one Latin songs of 2012

References

2011 singles
Paulina Rubio songs
Spanish-language songs
Song recordings produced by RedOne
Songs written by Paulina Rubio
2011 songs